High Bridge is a former hamlet located in the town of Manlius, New York in Onondaga County, just east of the city of Syracuse. High Bridge was founded around 1833 but was defunct less than a century later.

History
The village was founded around 1833 and became known as High Bridge after the adjacent bridge over Limestone Creek. A school was built in 1849, and a double arch bridge in 1856. High Bridge was renamed to Elk Horn in 1880 in anticipation of the building of a post office; however, it was not built until 1895 and lasted just two years. The name then reverted to High Bridge.

High Bridge began to decline even as early as 1856 when many residents moved to the Midwest. However, the village lasted until the nearby lime mines gave out in the early 1900s. The hotel burned in 1913, and the union church was abandoned in 1925. By 1933, High Bridge had ceased to exist as such.

Highbridge Road, now New York Route 92, runs from NY-5 at Lyndon Corners to NY-257 in Manlius. The arch bridges have been replaced with a modern steel and concrete span. Highbridge Street runs as New York Route 109 for a short distance and continues as a local road to NY-5.

References

Former populated places in Onondaga County, New York
Manlius, New York